Peter McKenna (born 27 August 1946 in Brunswick West, Victoria) is a former Australian rules footballer who represented Collingwood and Carlton in the Victorian Football League (VFL) during the 1960s and 1970s. He also represented Devonport in the North West Football Union (NWFU), and Northcote, Port Melbourne and Geelong West in the Victorian Football Association (VFA).

Regarded as one of the best full-forwards to ever play the game, McKenna holds the VFL/AFL record for the longest sequence of matches in which he scored at least one goal: 121 matches. A moptop hairstyle, genial grin, and a gift for taking chest-high marks won McKenna adulation in the 1960s and 1970s as the game's first multimedia star. He continued his involvement in the game as a commentator with the Seven Network during the 1980s and 1990s.

Playing career
McKenna was the second of five children to Winnie and Kevin McKenna. He grew up supporting  and played soccer until he was 13.

Recruited from West Heidelberg YCW, McKenna credited Collingwood coach Bob Rose for patiently helping to shape him into the champion footballer he was to become. In the opening round of the 1966 VFL season against  at Victoria Park, McKenna gave a glimpse of what was to come when he kicked 12 goals in a match-winning effort, the first of thirteen occasions when he would kick ten or more goals in a game. However, McKenna's form dropped away; and, after being held goalless against  in Round 6, he was dropped for the remainder of the season.

Many full-forwards are quick on the lead, but the truly great ones seem to know instinctively how to get the maximum advantage from their leads by timing them to perfection. In this particular skill, McKenna has had few peers, and once he had gained possession of the ball, usually from a bullet stab pass from Barry Price or Wayne Richardson, he almost invariably finished things off with consummate precision, typically using a kick with which the jury, at the time, was still out: the drop punt.

McKenna topped the Magpies' goalkicking list for the first of eight consecutive times in 1967, booting 47 goals. Over the ensuing seasons, he gradually improved, kicking 97 goals in 1969, before amassing an incredible tally of 143 the following year. What was even more incredible was that it was not sufficient to top the VFL's goal kicking list; Hawthorn's Peter Hudson kicked 146 goals, adding a record-equalling 150 goals in 1971 compared to McKenna's tally of 134. From the start of the 1968 VFL season to Round 3, 1974, McKenna kicked at least one goal in 121 consecutive games, still a competition record.

Moderately disappointing though this doubtless was, what was almost certainly of more concern to McKenna was his failure to contribute towards a Collingwood premiership. The Magpies reached the grand final twice during his career—losing to St Kilda by a point in 1966, although McKenna did not play—and then squandering a half-time lead of 44 points against Carlton four years later. In that game, McKenna's misfortune in sustaining a concussion after colliding with teammate Des Tuddenham during the second term undoubtedly contributed greatly to Collingwood's second-half demise. Nevertheless, he finished the game with 6 goals, more than anybody else on the ground.

Peter McKenna finally managed to head the VFL's list goalkicking with 130 goals to win the Coleman Medal in 1972, a season which also saw him achieve All-Australian selection after booting 19 goals in 3 games at the Perth carnival. The following year, McKenna's total of 86 goals was sufficient for him to claim pole position on the VFL's list and earn a second successive Coleman Medal.

At the end of Round 10, 1975, McKenna led Collingwood's goalkicking list with a modest total of 26 goals, but the following week he had a poor game in which he was held goalless in the Round 11 Queen's Birthday match against Melbourne Football Club. This performance saw him and a number of teammates in Round 12 dropped to the reserves against South Melbourne Football Club at VFL Park (now known as Waverly Park). There he sustained a serious kidney injury that brought his season, and his Collingwood career, to a close. 1976 saw him lining up with the Devonport Magpies in Tasmania's North West Football Union (NWFU). McKenna enjoyed a solid, confidence-boosting season in Tasmania, kicking 79 goals in 17 games.

In 1977, McKenna returned to the mainland for another stint in the VFL. Sadly, at least as far as McKenna was concerned, Collingwood was loath to pay big money for its former star, and with some reluctance he opted to front up with arch-rival Carlton instead. In what was by no means an ignominious comeback, McKenna managed 36 goals in 11 games, but it seemed clear to all parties concerned that he was some way past his best. As a result, he left Carlton and spent the next three years giving good service to VFA clubs Geelong West (67 goals) and Port Melbourne (52 goals), where he was captain/coach, and Northcote (98 goals).

Altogether, McKenna's VFL record of 874 goals from 191 games was enough to place him as the league's fourth-highest goalkicker at the time of his retirement, behind only Gordon Coventry, Doug Wade and Jack Titus. As of the end of the 2021 AFL season, he sat tenth on the all-time league leaderboard; additionally, he has scored the most goals of any player to finish their career with fewer than 200 VFL/AFL games. His full senior and representative career yielded 1,213 goals.

VFL statistics

|-
|- style="background-color: #EAEAEA"
! scope="row" style="text-align:center" | 1965
|style="text-align:center;"|
| 15 || 12 || 21 || 12 || 110 || 15 || 125 || 47 ||  || 1.8 || 1.0 || 9.2 || 1.3 || 10.4 || 3.9 || 
|-
! scope="row" style="text-align:center" | 1966
|style="text-align:center;"|
| 6 || 6 || 20 || 11 || 64 || 19 || 83 || 40 ||  || 3.3 || 1.8 || 10.7 || 3.2 || 13.8 || 6.7 || 
|- style="background-color: #EAEAEA"
! scope="row" style="text-align:center" | 1967
|style="text-align:center;"|
| 6 || 16 || 47 || 33 || 186 || 21 || 207 || 96 ||  || 2.9 || 2.1 || 11.6 || 1.3 || 12.9 || 6.0 || 
|-
! scope="row" style="text-align:center" | 1968
|style="text-align:center;"|
| 6 || 15 || 64 || 34 || 145 || 14 || 159 || 81 ||  || 4.3 || 2.3 || 9.7 || 0.9 || 10.6 || 5.4 || 
|- style="background-color: #EAEAEA"
! scope="row" style="text-align:center" | 1969
|style="text-align:center;"|
| 6 || 19 || 98 || 55 || 241 || 24 || 265 || 125 ||  || 5.2 || 2.9 || 12.7 || 1.3 || 13.9 || 6.6 || 
|-
! scope="row" style="text-align:center" | 1970
|style="text-align:center;"|
| 6 || 22 || 143 || bgcolor="DD6E81"| 80 || 294 || 32 || 326 || 164 ||  || 6.5 || bgcolor="DD6E81"| 3.6 || 13.4 || 1.5 || 14.8 || 7.5 || 
|- style="background-color: #EAEAEA"
! scope="row" style="text-align:center" | 1971
|style="text-align:center;"|
| 6 || 22 || 134 || bgcolor="DD6E81"| 79 || 282 || 32 || 314 || 159 ||  || 6.1 || bgcolor="DD6E81"| 3.6 || 12.8 || 1.5 || 14.3 || 7.2 || 
|-
! scope="row" style="text-align:center" | 1972
|style="text-align:center;"|
| 6 || 20 || bgcolor="DD6E81"| 130 || 53 || 225 || 23 || 248 || 132 ||  || bgcolor="DD6E81"| 6.5 || 2.7 || 11.3 || 1.2 || 12.4 || 6.6 || 
|- style="background-color: #EAEAEA"
! scope="row" style="text-align:center" | 1973
|style="text-align:center;"|
| 6 || 20 || bgcolor="DD6E81"| 86 || 42 || 179 || 17 || 196 || 113 ||  || bgcolor="DD6E81"| 4.3 || 2.1 || 9.0 || 0.9 || 9.8 || 5.7 || 
|-
! scope="row" style="text-align:center" | 1974
|style="text-align:center;"|
| 6 || 18 || 69 || 34 || 138 || 14 || 152 || 85 ||  || 3.8 || 1.9 || 7.7 || 0.8 || 8.4 || 4.7 || 
|- style="background-color: #EAEAEA"
! scope="row" style="text-align:center" | 1975
|style="text-align:center;"|
| 6 || 10 || 26 || 14 || 59 || 11 || 70 || 31 ||  || 2.6 || 1.6 || 6.6 || 1.2 || 7.8 || 3.4 || 
|-
! scope="row" style="text-align:center" | 1977
|style="text-align:center;"|
| 27 || 11 || 36 || 23 || 89 || 10 || 99 || 41 ||  || 3.3 || 2.1 || 8.1 || 0.9 || 9.0 || 3.7 || 
|- class="sortbottom"
! colspan=3| Career
! 191
! 874
! 470
! 2012
! 232
! 2244
! 1114
! 
! 4.6
! 2.5
! 10.6
! 1.2
! 11.8
! 5.9
! 
|}

Life off the football field
At his peak, Peter McKenna could lay claim to being the most popular footballer in the VFL – and, indeed, given the burgeoning impact of the mass media, almost certainly the most popular footballer ever in Australia up to that point. Not only was he a highly successful full forward playing for the nation's most popular sporting club, he possessed a Beatle-esque 'look' which, by the standards of the time, was an adman's dream.

During this time, he recorded his first pop single Things to Remember, written by Melbourne singer/songwriter Colin Buckley. This was followed by another single Smile, written by Johnny Young.

In 1969, he was a teacher at Fairfield State Primary.

In the late 1970s and early 1980s he taught at Marcellin College Junior boys school in Camberwell.

McKenna appeared regularly on television at this time, being Daryl Somers' co-host of Hey Hey It's Saturday for the show's first eight weeks in late 1971, and continuing to appear after Ossie Ostrich had replaced him as co-host. There were also appearances on shows such as Young Talent Time and Happening '72.

In 1973, he published a book describing his life and career to date, and his thoughts on the VFL and Australian football in general. The book was co-written with Phillip Burfurd and published in the Jack Pollard Sportsmaster range of titles. My World Of Football was subtitled "The candid, provocative innermost thoughts and technical secrets of an Australian football hero".

After his football career had ended, McKenna commentated football with the Seven Network until Seven lost the rights to broadcast AFL matches after the 2001 AFL season. He then worked in radio and as a part-time goalkicking coach at Collingwood until May 2004 when it was announced that McKenna would begin working as a ministerial transport officer (chauffeur) for the Parliament of Victoria.

In September 2007, in an attempt to boost public awareness and support for epilepsy sufferers and their families, McKenna opened up about the three deaths in his family that had impacted him deeply over the years; those of his older sister Marie, who died after suffering an epileptic seizure just days out from McKenna's 21st birthday, and father Kevin and brother Gerard from diabetes-related illnesses.

McKenna is married with two daughters and two grandsons.

References

Bibliography
 * Atkinson, G. (1982) Everything you ever wanted to know about Australian rules football but couldn't be bothered asking, The Five Mile Press: Melbourne. .
My World Of Football, Peter McKenna with Phillip Burfurd, 1973.

External links

Collingwood Football Club players
Coleman Medal winners
Carlton Football Club players
Copeland Trophy winners
All-Australians (1953–1988)
Australian Football Hall of Fame inductees
Australian rules football commentators
Australian television presenters
Devonport Football Club players
Northcote Football Club players
Port Melbourne Football Club coaches
Geelong West Football Club players
1946 births
Living people
Australian rules footballers from Melbourne
People from Brunswick, Victoria